Brandon Banks is the second studio album by American rapper Maxo Kream, released on July 19, 2019, by Big Persona, 88 Classic, and RCA Records. It is his major-label debut album. The album was produced by Mike Dean, Teej, Kal Banx, Smash David, D.A. Doman, among others. It also features guest appearances from Travis Scott, Megan Thee Stallion, Schoolboy Q, ASAP Ferg and KCG Josh.

Critical reception

The album was widely acclaimed by critics. Stephen Kearse of Pitchfork stated that "like Punken before it, Brandon Banks is a major leap in craft and style as well as refinement of his self-image."

Track listing
Credits were adapted from the album's liner notes, Tidal.

Charts

References

2019 albums
Albums produced by Chuck Inglish
Albums produced by Mike Dean (record producer)
Albums produced by Zaytoven
RCA Records albums